was a Japanese animation studio closed on October 1, 2006. The studio was formed on September 3, 2001 from a merger between Radix (founded on December 6, 1995) and Zero-G Room (founded on September 11, 1991). Much of the staff from Radix Ace joined Seven or merged with Mobanimation to become Radix Mobanimation in 2007.

Works

TV series

OVAs/ONAs

References

External links
Radix Ace Entertainment

Japanese animation studios
Japanese companies established in 2001
Defunct mass media companies of Japan
Mass media companies established in 2001
Mass media companies disestablished in 2006
Japanese companies disestablished in 2006